Jaruwan Jenjudkarn (born 4 July 1970) is a Thai athlete. She competed in the women's high jump at the 1992 Summer Olympics.

References

External links
 

1970 births
Living people
Athletes (track and field) at the 1992 Summer Olympics
Jaruwan Jenjudkarn
Jaruwan Jenjudkarn
Place of birth missing (living people)
Athletes (track and field) at the 1994 Asian Games
Jaruwan Jenjudkarn
Jaruwan Jenjudkarn
Jaruwan Jenjudkarn
Southeast Asian Games medalists in athletics
Jaruwan Jenjudkarn